Des Arc   is a city on the White River in the Arkansas Delta, United States. It is the largest city in Prairie County, Arkansas, and the county seat for the county's northern district. Incorporated in 1854, Des Arc's position on the river has shaped its culture, history, and economy, beginning as a major lumber shipping port but leaving the city vulnerable to major floods in 1927 and 1937. As river shipping declined, Des Arc was bypassed by railroads, Interstate highways, and much of the post-industrial society. Des Arc's history is preserved by seven listings on the National Register of Historic Places, and the region's history is interpreted at Lower White River Museum State Park. The city's population stopped growing in the 1980s and has been declining since, with a population of 1,717 at the 2010 Census.

History
White settlement in the area began in the Lower White River Valley while the area was within French Louisiana, which lasted from 1686-1763. French from Canada and South Louisiana passed through the area while hunting and trapping bears and other animals. They shipped furs and bear oil downriver to Arkansas Post, which was the only established settlement in the region, then likely onto New Orleans. During this period, several places were named by the French, including Des Arc and other places in Prairie County such as La Grue.

Des Arc was founded in 1854. A map shows the original town included 80 residential blocks, and two blocks for a commercial district. The gridded street pattern has never been fully developed, though most of the streets and blocks match the 1854 plan. The gridded east-west street pattern began with a street named McNulty Street in the north, near where present-day Highway 38 is located along the northern edge of the city. The southernmost east-west street was Barrier Street. The town ran from Foster Street (present-day First Street) on the eastern side, to present-day Eighth Street.

Geography

Des Arc is located in the Lower White River segment of the Arkansas Delta (in Arkansas, usually referred to as "the Delta"). The Arkansas Delta is a subregion of the Mississippi Alluvial Plain, which is a flat area consisting of rich, fertile sediment deposits from the Mississippi River between Louisiana and Illinois. The White River Lowlands contain swamps and forests, in contrast to southern portions of Prairie County within the Grand Prairie, a subdivision of the Arkansas Delta known today for rice farming and aquaculture.

Climate
Prairie County has a humid subtropical climate (Köppen Cfa). Prairie County experiences all four seasons, although summers can be extremely hot and humid and winters are mild with little snow. Temperatures above  are not uncommon.

Demographics

2020 Census

As of the 2020 United States census, there were 1,905 people, 715 households, and 446 families residing in the city.

2000 Census
As of the census of 2000, there were 1,933 people, 783 households, and 534 families residing in the city. The racial makeup of the city was 83.03% White, 14.80% Black or African American, 1.30% Native American, 0.31% Asian, 0.62% from other races, and 0.93% from two or more races.  1.29% of the population were Hispanic or Latino of any race.

There were 783 households, out of which 30.0% had children under the age of 18 living with them, 48.3% were married couples living together, 16.6% had a female householder with no husband present, and 31.7% were non-families. 29.4% of all households were made up of individuals, and 15.8% had someone living alone who was 65 years of age or older.  The average household size was 2.38 and the average family size was 2.93.

In the city, the population was spread out, with 24.6% under the age of 18, 7.4% from 18 to 24, 25.7% from 25 to 44, 23.0% from 45 to 64, and 19.2% who were 65 years of age or older.  The median age was 40 years. For every 100 females, there were 89.0 males.  For every 100 females age 18 and over, there were 83.5 males.

The median income for a household in the city was $23,750, and the median income for a family was $28,264. Males had a median income of $26,250 versus $17,500 for females. The per capita income for the city was $14,629.  About 16.3% of families and 20.0% of the population were below the poverty line, including 32.2% of those under age 18 and 12.9% of those age 65 or over.

Culture and contemporary life

Des Arc has seven properties listed on the National Register of Historic Places, including Bethel House, at Erwin and 2nd Streets, designed by architect Charles L. Thompson.

Government
Des Arc operates within the mayor-city council form of government. The mayor is elected by a citywide election to serve as the Chief Executive Officer (CEO) of the city by presiding over all city functions, policies, rules and laws. Once elected, the mayor also allocates duties to city employees. Mayors serve four-year terms and can serve unlimited terms. The city council is the unicameral legislative of the City, consisting of six aldermen. Also included in the council's duties is balancing the city's budget and passing ordinances.

Human resources

Education
Des Arc is served by the Des Arc School District.

Des Arc Pre-K
Des Arc Elementary School K-6
Des Arc High School 7-12

Public safety
The city is served by the Des Arc Police Department and the Des Arc Fire Department.

The city is under the jurisdiction of the 23rd District Court, a state district court. State district courts in Arkansas are courts of original jurisdiction for criminal, civil (up to $25,000), small claims, and traffic matters. State district courts are presided over by a full-time District Judge elected to a four-year term by a districtwide election.

Superseding district court jurisdiction is the 17th Judicial Circuit Court, which covers Prairie and White counties. The 17th Circuit contains three circuit judges, elected to six-year terms circuitwide. Circuit court is held in Searcy. The circuit also contains a drug court.

Notes

References

 

Cities in Arkansas
Cities in Prairie County, Arkansas
County seats in Arkansas